The 9th Alberta Legislative Assembly was in session from February 20, 1941, to July 7, 1944, with the membership of the assembly determined by the results of the 1940 Alberta general election held on March 21, 1940. The Legislature officially resumed on February 20, 1941, and continued until the fourth session was prorogued on March 24, 1944 and dissolved on July 7, 1944, prior to the 1944 Alberta general election.

Alberta's 9th government was controlled by the majority Social Credit Party for the second time, led by Premier William Aberhart until his death on May 23, 1943; he was succeeded by Ernest Manning, who would go on to be the longest serving Premier in Alberta history. Manning would abandon the monetary policies of Aberhart during his term for more traditional conservatism. The Official Opposition was led by James H. Walker, a member of the Independent Citizen's Association, from February 22, 1941 to April 8, 1941, and again from February 10, 1944 to March 24, 1944. In between Alfred Speakman would serve as Opposition Leader from January 29, 1942 to March 19, 1942, and James Mahaffy from February 18, 1943 to March 30, 1943. The Speaker was Peter Dawson, who would serve until his death during the 15th legislature on March 24, 1963.

The Independent Citizen's Association, started by the Conservatives and including most Liberals and some former United Farmer supporters, won 19 seats. The remaining Liberal Party that did not endorse the independent movement won one seat, and a labour candidate won one seat. Two independents later re-joined the Liberal Party, and the Co-operative Commonwealth entered the Legislature in its first by-election.

Bills
During the second session the government would introduce An Act to prohibit the Sale of Lands to any Enemy Aliens and Hutterites for the Duration of the War (Bill 60) which prohibited the purchase or registration of lands by an enemy alien or Hutterite. It is the intention to prevent these people from buying land or from becoming registered as the owners of land at least until after the Second World War ended. The government would later introduce An Act to amend The Land Sales Prohibition Act (Bill 48) in the third session, which amended The Land Sales Prohibition Act for the purpose of extending this prohibition to leases and agreements for leases. The federal government under Prime Minister William Lyon Mackenzie King's's Cabinet would disallow the legislation on the recommendation of the Federal Minister of Justice Louis St. Laurent. This was the last use of the federal disallowance authority in Canadian history (not to be confused is reservation authority which was last used in Saskatchewan in 1961). The King government's rationale for the disallowance was the federal government had regulated all matters related to enemy aliens and the statute would conflict with federal policy.

Party standings after 9th General Elections

References

Further reading

External links
Alberta Legislative Assembly
Legislative Assembly of Alberta Members Book
By-elections 1905 to present

09th Alberta Legislative Assembly